Kwasowiec  is a village in the administrative district of Gmina Nowy Kawęczyn, within Skierniewice County, Łódź Voivodeship, in central Poland. The village has a population of approximately 60 people.

References

Kwasowiec